Below are the squads for the Football at the 1978 All-Africa Games, hosted by Algiers, Algeria, and which took place between 13 and 28 July 1978.

Group A

Algeria
Head coach: Rachid Mekhloufi

Egypt
Head coach: Taha Ismail

Libya

Malawi

Group B

Cameroon
Head coach:

Ghana

Mali

Nigeria
Head coach: C. A. Alakija and Lekan Salami

External links
Football III All Africa Games - Algiers 1978 - todor66.com

Squads
African Games football squads